The depiction of Islamic prophet Muhammad in film (as with other visual depictions) is a controversial topic both within and outside of Islam. Although the Quran does not explicitly forbid images of Muhammad, there are a few hadith (supplemental teachings) which have explicitly prohibited Muslims from creating visual depictions of figures. Because the different branches of Islam use different Hadith collections, there is a split on this issue between the two major denominations of Islam, Sunni and Shia Islam.

Most Sunni Muslims believe that visual depictions of all the prophets of Islam should be prohibited and are particularly averse to visual representations of Muhammad. In 1926, Egyptian actor Youssef Wahbi was in discussions to play Muhammad in a film financed by the Turkish government under Atatürk. When the Sunni Islamic Al-Azhar University in Cairo heard about it, scholars there released a fatwa stipulating that Islam forbids the depiction of Muhammad on screen and King Fuad then sent a severe warning to the actor, threatening to exile him and strip him of his Egyptian nationality. As a result of the controversy, the film was abandoned.

In Shia Islam, scholars historically were also against such depictions, but have taken a more relaxed view over the years and images of Muhammad are quite common nowadays. A fatwa given by Ali al-Sistani, the Shi'a marja of Iraq, states that it is permissible to depict Muhammad, even in television or movies, if done with respect.

Notable films

L'Inferno

Dante's Inferno, originally released in Italy as L'Inferno, was one of, if not the first depiction of Muhammad in a feature-length film. The depiction of Muhammad in L'Inferno is very brief and very unflattering. It has a brief section in which Muhammad is being tortured in Hell with his chest opened, exposing his entrails.

The Message

Mohammad, Messenger of God, released in the US as The Message, was the first major film about Muhammad. The film was released on January 1, 1976 and on July 29 of the same year it had its premiere in "Plaza", a London cinema. There are two versions of the movie, an English one and an Arab one. The Arab version had also its premiere in a London cinema, Curzon, on August 19, 1976. Both versions were screened till September 29. So the English version was shown for nine weeks, and the Arab version for six weeks.

When director Mustafa Akkad was shooting the film, he made use of an American cast and an Egyptian cast. In the English version Anthony Quinn played Hamza, Michael Ansara Muhammad's principal opponent Abu Sufyan, and Irene Papas Abu Sufyan's wife Hind. In the Arab version these roles were played by Egyptian actors. However, in a number of overall shots, in which a large group is acting, such as the Battle of Badr, it can be heard that the scene is shot only once, as the actors shout "Allahu Akbar", whereas in other similar scenes the director opted for "God is great".

Although the movie is about Muhammad, the director decided to shoot the film so as to not depict Muhammad. Akkad frequently changed the position of the camera at moments when Muhammad would be brought into vision. When Muhammad was essential to a scene, the camera would show events from his point of view.

The Message became very popular, not the least in the circles of Muslims, for example in Africa, and Asia. Even so, two well-known fatwas from Al-Azhar University and Shiite Council of Lebanon were issued about The Message.

Muhammad: The Last Prophet

Muhammad: The Last Prophet is an animated film produced by Badr International according to the same principles as "The Message". Its director is Richard Rich. The movie was released in 2004 and it was screened in a limited number of movie-theatres in the United States and the United Kingdom. The film focuses on the early period of Islam.

Muhammad: The Messenger of God

In October 2012, Iranian director Majid Majidi began shooting a film titled  Muhammad: The Messenger of God with plans to show Muhammad on screen, though not his face, as per Shia tradition. The film world premier was on 27 August 2015.

The Lady of Heaven

In June 2020, Deadline Hollywood announced that Enlightened Kingdom were producing The Lady of Heaven which would be the first film that shows the face of Muhammad. In order to respect aniconism in Islam, Muhammad was portrayed by light and cinematic effects as opposed to being portrayed by an actor or single individual. The producers of the film also discussed how they tackled the very challenging aspect of depicting a Muslim holy personality. A trailer for the film was released on 23 December 2020 followed by a US theatrical release date a year later on 10 December 2021.

Later projects
There are some new films currently being produced about Muhammad, considered the "second of their kind" (referring to Western films respecting the portrayal of Muhammad).

In October 2008, Producer Oscar Zoghbi, who worked on the original The Message, stated that he would shooting a remake called The Messenger of Peace, to be shot around the holy cities of Mecca and Medina.

Film producer Barrie M. Osborne has been hired as an adviser on a possible series of epics about Muhammad. The films, which are financed by a Qatari media company and will be supervised by the Egyptian cleric Yusuf al-Qaradawi, are unlikely to depict Muhammad at all on screen as per Sunni tradition which sees all renderings of the prophets as blasphemous.

List of films

See also

 List of Islamic films
 List of animated Islamic films
 Depictions of Muhammad
 Historicity of Muhammad
 History of Islam
 List of biographies of Muhammad
 Muhammad in Islam
 Prophetic biography

References

Further reading
 Bakker, Freek, Cinema, in Muhammad in History, Thought, and Culture: An Encyclopedia of the Prophet of God (2 vols.), Edited by C. Fitzpatrick and A. Walker, Santa Barbara, ABC-CLIO, 2014. 

 
Films